Garry Mapanzure (born June 18, 1998) is a Zimbabwean Afropop singer.

Born Gerry Garikai Munashe Mapanzure in Harare, Zimbabwe, Garry grew up in church to pastoral parents and it is in church where he discovered his singing ability and honed his talent. He attended Kyle preparatory school and continued to primary and high school at the same institution.

Music career
Garry started his musical career in late 2017 and released his first single called Wapunza which has clocked over 2 million views on YouTube.

2019 saw the contemporary artist being nominated for the prestigious AFRIMA awards in the Best Artiste, Duo or Group in African R'N'B & Soul category for his song TV Room, a collaboration with Hillzy.

In November 2018, he contested in the emPawa Africa challenge created by Mr Eazi to help upcoming African artists launch their careers. To enter the contest artists had to upload a short video (one minute max) to Instagram of themselves performing either an original song, cover or freestyle, with the hashtag #emPawa100. Garry won and became the 10th emPawa Africa pick, the first ever from Zimbabwe. Through this initiative, Garry released "Slow" which was uploaded onto the emPawa YouTube channel.

Artistry
In an interview with All Africa, Garry described his sound as "Afropop", which is a fusion of  Pop and Afrobeats.

Personal life
Garry Mapanzure was studying Architectural Design at North China University of Technology before being signed to UK, London-based record label, Runabeat Music.  Under the label he released his first EP entitled, 'Sushi Season: The First', in March 2020.  His first world tour scheduled for March 2020 to support the EP's release was cancelled due to the global outbreak of coronavirus in March 2020.  Garry is now residing in London, United Kingdom, working on future music audio and visual projects until the coronavirus pandemic passes.

Discography

Singles
Since Garry started his career in 2017 he has released the following singles:

Compilations
Garry Mapanzure's first music compilation was released in March 2020, entitled 'Sushi Season: The First'

Awards and nominations

AFRIMA Awards 

!Ref
|-
||2019
|Himself
|BEST ARTISTE, DUO OR GROUP IN AFRICAN R'N'B & SOUL
| 
| 
|-

Masvingo Music and Arts Awards 

!Ref
|-
||2019
|Himself
|OUTSTANDING MALE ARTISTE 
| 
| 
|-
 
He speaks Shona which is one of the langues in Zimbabwe

Glamour Awards 

!Ref
|-
||2018
|Himself
|BEST UPCOMING ARTIST
| 
| 
|-

See also
List of Zimbabwean musicians

References

1998 births
Living people
Zimbabwean musicians